Cheluridae is a family of amphipods. It is the only family classified under the superfamily Cheluroidea.

At least three genera are included:
Chelura Phillippi, 1839
Nippochelura Barnard, 1959
Tropichelura Barnard, 1959

References

Corophiidea
Crustacean families